Tall Stories From Under the Table is the second and final album from the London-based band Dogs, released in 2007.

Track listing
 "Dirty Little Shop" - 3:48
 "Soldier On" - 3:11
 "Winston Smith" - 3:33
 "This Stone Is a Bullet" - 3:24
 "Chained to No-One" - 3:18
 "Forget It All" - 3:42
 "Little Pretenders" - 2:49
 "On a Bridge, By a Pub" - 2:36
 "Who Are Yu" - 3:31
 "These Days" - 3:40
 "By The River" - 4:29
 "Let It Lay" (feat. Paul Weller) - 3:16

2007 albums
Dogs (British band) albums